Tatei Ridge is located on the border of Alberta and British Columbia. It was named in 1912 Charles D. Walcott.

See also
 List of peaks on the Alberta–British Columbia border
 Mountains of Alberta
 Mountains of British Columbia

References

Tatei Ridge
Tatei Ridge
Canadian Rockies